Charles T. Rubin is a political science professor, philosopher and writer. Rubin was raised in Cleveland, Ohio and attended nearby Case Western Reserve University, receiving a bachelors degree in philosophy and political science in 1975. He went on to study at Boston College, where he graduated with a doctoral degree in 1983 and also where he met his wife Leslie Rubin, a fellow political science academic. Rubin and his wife taught at Kenyon College before both moving to Duquesne University as professors and raising their children. Rubin began at Duquesne as an assistant professor in 1987 and continued teaching there for over 30 years. He was appointed as an endowed chair in 2019. 

Rubin is the author of The Green Crusade, a 1998 book which questions the scientific basis for claims and predictions made by environmentalists, specifically naming Rachel Carson and Paul Erlich. In 2008, the President's Council on Bioethics commissioned two essays by Rubin on upholding human dignity, which he titled "Human Dignity and the Future of Man" and "Commentary on Bostrom". In 2014, his book Eclipse of Man was released. In it, Rubin considers the advancements of technology and cautions against hasty adoption of transhumanism.

Works

References

Duquesne University faculty
Living people
Year of birth missing (living people)
Case Western Reserve University alumni
Morrissey College of Arts & Sciences alumni
Philosophers from Ohio